Choristoneura irina is a species of moth of the family Tortricidae. It is found in Khabarovsk Krai, Russia.

References

Moths described in 2007
Choristoneura